The Somalo (plural: Somali, صومالي) was the currency of the Trust Territory of Somaliland administered by Italy between 1950 and 1960. The "Somalo" remained officially in use in the newly created Somali Republic until 1962. It was subdivided into 100 centesimi (singular: centesimo).

History

The "Somalo" was authorized by Trusteeship Administration Ordinance No. 14 of 16 May 1950. A currency exchange was scheduled to last from 16 May until 22 July, but was eventually extended until 22 August. The somalo replaced the East African shilling at par and remained equal to it. 

It replaced the small amount of Italian lire in circulation at 1 Somalo = IT₤87.49. It was given an IMF parity of 124.414 mg fine gold, equal to one shilling sterling. Internationally, this currency became known as the Somali shilling when Somalia became independent on 1 July 1960. 

The Somalo/shilling was replaced at par on 15 December 1962 (along with the East African shilling circulating in British Somaliland) by the scellino (Somali shilling).

Following independence in 1960, the somalo of Italian Somaliland and the East African shilling (which were equal in value) were replaced at par in 1962 by the Somali shilling. Names used for the denominations were cent (singular: centesimo; plural: centesimi) and سنت (plural: سنتيمات and سنتيما) together with shilling (singular: scellino; plural: scellini) and شلن.

Coins

In 1950, coins were introduced in denominations of 1, 5, 10 and 50 centesimi and 1 somalo. The three lower denominations were minted in copper, with the higher two being struck in silver.

Banknotes

The Cassa per la Circolazione Monetaria della Somalia, headquartered in Rome, began operations 18 April 1950 and was authorized to issue 55 million shillings in paper money. It released notes in denominations of 1, 5, 10, 20 and 100 somali on 22 May 1950.  The banknotes were written in Italian and Arab language.

A smaller version of the 5-Somali note was put into circulation in May 1951. These notes were withdrawn beginning 15 December 1962 and ceased to be legal tender on 31 December 1963.

Notes

Bibliography

External links

 Somali coins from 1895 to 1962 (in Italian)

Modern obsolete currencies
Economic history of Somalia
1950 establishments in Somalia
1962 disestablishments
Italy–Somalia relations
Currencies of Somalia